Jan Filip (born 25 December 1900 in Chocnějovice, died 30 April  1981 in Prague) was a Czechoslovak prehistorian.

Life 
Filip was Professor of prehistory at Prague University, director of the Archaeological Institute and member of the Czech Academy of Sciences. He wrote numerous scholarly publications, among them two of the fundamental reference works for archaeological research in Central Europe. He also founded the professional journal Archeologické rozhledy, published since 1949.

Filip influenced the generations of Czech researchers who followed him, setting an example with his statements not hindered by national or political concerns. A great part of his work remains relevant to this day.

Publications 
 Die Urnenfelder und die Anfänge der Eisenzeit in Böhmen, Prague 1936/37.
 Kapitel aus der Kultur unserer Urzeit, Prague 1940.
 Kunsthandwerk in der Urzeit, Prague 1941.
 The Beginnings of Slaw Settlements in Czechoslovakia, Prague 1946.
 Keltové ve střední evropě. (Die Kelten in Mitteleuropa.) Monumenta Archaeologica 5. Verlag Akademie der Wissenschaften, Prague 1956.
 Die keltische Zivilisation, Prague 1961.
 Jan Filip et alia: Enzyklopädisches Handbuch zur Ur- und Frühgeschichte Europas. Akademia. Verlag der Akademie der Wissenschaften, Prague 1966-1969. 2 volumes.

External links 

 

Prehistorians
Czechoslovak archaeologists
1900 births
1981 deaths
Herder Prize recipients
Members of the German Academy of Sciences at Berlin